Johannes Frey, O.F.M. (died 1474) was a Roman Catholic prelate who served as Auxiliary Bishop of Freising (1457–1474).

Biography
Johannes Frey was ordained a priest in the Order of Friars Minor. On 19 Aug 1457, he was appointed during the papacy of Pope Callixtus III as Auxiliary Bishop of Freising and Titular Bishop of Saldae. He served as Auxiliary Bishop of Freising until his death on 8 Apr 1474. While bishop, he was the principal co-consecrator of Wilhelm von Reichenau, Bishop of Eichstätt (1464); and Jodok Seitz, Auxiliary Bishop of Augsburg (1464).

See also
Catholic Church in Germany

References 

15th-century German Roman Catholic bishops
Bishops appointed by Pope Callixtus III
1474 deaths